Vijay Sharma (born 20 September 1998) is an Indian cricketer. He made his Twenty20 debut for Uttarakhand in the 2018–19 Syed Mushtaq Ali Trophy on 21 February 2019. He made his List A debut on 8 December 2021, for Uttarakhand in the 2021–22 Vijay Hazare Trophy.

References

External links
 

1998 births
Living people
Indian cricketers
Uttarakhand cricketers
Place of birth missing (living people)